The 2016 Euro RX of Sweden is the fifth round of the forty-first season of the FIA European Rallycross Championship. The event was held at the Höljesbanan in the village of Höljes, Värmland as an undercard to the 2016 World RX of Sweden, and was the only event on the 2016 calendar to have all three categories running.

Supercar

Heats

Semi-finals
Semi-Final 1

Semi-Final 2

Final

Standings after the event

Supercar standings

Super1600 standings

TouringCar standings

 Note: Only the top five positions are included for both sets of standings.

References

|- style="text-align:center"
|width="35%"|Previous race:2016 Euro RX of Norway
|width="35%"|FIA European RallycrossChampionship2016 season
|width="35%"|Next race:2016 Euro RX of France

Sweden
Euro RX